Rúnar Örn Ágústsson (born 7 July 1985) is an Icelandic road cyclist. He competed in the time trial at the 2019 and 2021 UCI Road World Championships.

Major results
2016
 2nd Road race, National Road Championships
2017
 2nd Time trial, National Road Championships
2018
 1st  Time trial, National Road Championships
2019
 2nd Time trial, National Road Championships
2020
 2nd Time trial, National Road Championships
2021
 National Road Championships
1st  Time trial
5th Road race

References

External links

1985 births
Living people
Icelandic male cyclists